Sri Gauri Mahatyam is a 1956 Indian Telugu-language swashbuckler film, directed by D. Yoganand. It stars N. T. Rama Rao and Sriranjani Jr., with music jointly composed by Ogirala Ramachandra Rao and T. V. Raju.

Plot 
The film begins with a King (C.S.R.) who has two wives, the first wife Satyavathi Devi (P. Hemalatha) is an ardent devotee of Goddess Mangala Gauri and she names her daughter Bala Gauri. On the other side, as the second wife Satyabhama (Suryakala) is childless she begrudges and poisons them when Satyavathi dies, but Gauri escapes. Years roll by, and Gauri (Srirajani Jr.) also grows up with the same devotion towards the goddess. Now Satyabhama decides to couple up her with a lunatic and assigns the task to gardener Thantalu (Relangi). But faithful Thantalu wants to stop this atrocity. Fortuitously, on the way, he gets acquainted with Prince Balaveera (N. T. Rama Rao). Learning about the plight, Balaveera promises Thantalu to wed Gauri, so, he enters in disguise as a lunatic and marries Gauri. Soon after, a dreadful secret is revealed regarding Balaveera. In his childhood, his father Satyavrata (Srivatsa) has broken an anoint pot on the idol when Lord Siva (Kanta Rao) curses that the lifespan of his son is equal to the number of pieces that the pot has broken. Here a conflict arises between Siva & Parvathi (Latha), one destroys another to protect Balaveera. At present, Siva sends his snake to hit Balaveera but Parvathi pullbacks and transforms it into a cruel human called Bhujanga (Mukkamala). But Bhujanga gets the power of Trishula and returns in search of Balaveera. By that time, Gauri & Balaveera decamp to the forest where they are captured by a tribal king Durjaya who throws Balaveera into the river and holds Gauri. In the palace, Bhujanga traces Gauri and brings her back. Parallelly, Balaveera is saved by a saint who suggests he pray to Goddess Parvathi to get rid off from these dilemmas, so, he does so, and acquires a weapon Chandrayudham as a boon. At that point, Bhujangam tries to remove the sacred wedding chain (Mangalasutra) of Gauri, soon, Balaveera lands and the war erupts. Ultimately, Balaveera throws Bhujangam into the fire when he again transforms into a snake and bites him. Angered Gauri throttles its neck when Siva & Parvathi appear and make Balaveera alive. Finally, the movie ends on a happy note.

Cast 
N. T. Rama Rao as Balaveerudu
Sriranjani Jr. as Gauri
Kanta Rao as Lord Shiva
Relangi as Tantalu
Mukkamala as Bhujanganadhudu
C. S. R. as Maharaju
Vangara as Astrologer
Balakrishna as Rangadu
S. Varalakshmi
Suryakantham as Raami
P. Hemalatha as Satyavathi Devi
Pushpavalli
Seeta as Kaami
Suryakala as Satyabhama
Latha as Goddess Parvathi

Soundtrack 

Music composed by Ogirala Ramachandra Rao and T. V. Raju.

References

External links 
 

1950s fantasy adventure films
1950s Telugu-language films
Films scored by T. V. Raju
Indian fantasy adventure films
Indian black-and-white films